The Miss Universo Uruguay 2008 was held on March 29, 2008. There were 14 candidates for the national title. The winner represented Uruguay at Miss Universe 2008, Reina Hispanoamericana 2008 and Miss Continente Americano 2008. The first runner up entered Reinado Internacional del Café 2008. The Best Departemental Costume was used in Miss Universe.

Results

Miss Universo Uruguay 2008 : Paula Andrea Díaz Gallone (Canelones)
1st Runner Up : Camila Fernández (Distrito Capital)
2nd Runner Up  : Úrsula Almeida (Montevideo)

Top 6

Patricia Plaván (Treinta y Tres)
Wendy Lemes (Río Negro)
Maia Yoffe (Montevideo)

Special awards
 Miss Photogenic (voted by press reporters) - Paula Díaz (Canelones)
 Miss Congeniality (voted by Miss Universo Uruguay contestants) - Natali Carro (Maldonado)
 Miss Internet - Paula Díaz (Canelones)
 Best Look - Paula Díaz (Canelones)
 Best Face - Paula Díaz (Canelones)
 Best Departemental Costume - Wendy Lemes (Río Negro)

Delegates

Artigas - Úrsula Almeida
Canelones - Paula Andrea Díaz Gallone
Colonia - Florencia Noya
Salto - Camila Fernández
Maldonado - Natali Carro
Montevideo - Maia Yoffe
Paysandú - Allison Fernández

Río Negro - Wendy Lemes
Salto - Lucia Pereira
Montevideo - Sofia Calvo
San José - Sabrina Machado
Salto - Carolina Campos
Tacuarembó - Maria Pia González
Treinta y Tres - Patricia Plaván

External links
http://www.elpais.com.uy/08/03/31/pciuda_338366.asp
https://web.archive.org/web/20080608222807/http://foro.univision.com/univision/board/message?board.id=miss&message.id=2175622
https://web.archive.org/web/20090218043154/http://globalbeauties.com/news/2008/march/uru.htm
https://web.archive.org/web/20080607171620/http://foro.univision.com/univision/board/message?board.id=miss&message.id=2167966

Miss Universo Uruguay
2008 beauty pageants
2008 in Uruguay